The 2018 Patriot League baseball tournament took place on consecutive weekends, with the semifinals held May 12–13 and the finals May 18–20.  The higher seeded teams each hosted best of three series. As champion, Army earned the conference's automatic bid to the 2018 NCAA Division I baseball tournament.

Seeding
The top four finishers from the regular season were seeded one through four, with the top seed hosting the fourth seed and second seed hosting the third.  The visiting team was designated as the home team in the second game of each series. Navy hosted Holy Cross while Army hosted Bucknell in the semifinals. Navy hosted Army in the final after both teams won their previous series.

Results

References

Tournament
Patriot League Baseball Tournament
Patriot League baseball tournament
Patriot League baseball tournament